ACCEA may refer to
The Armenian Center for Contemporary Experimental Art
The Advisory Committee on Clinical Excellence Awards in the UK